NLOGIT is an extension of the econometric and statistical software package LIMDEP.  In addition to the estimation tools in LIMDEP, NLOGIT provides programs for estimation, model simulation and analysis of multinomial choice data, such as brand choice, transportation mode and for survey and market data in which consumers choose among a set of competing alternatives.

In addition to the economic sciences, NLOGIT has applications in biostatistics, noneconomic social sciences, physical sciences, and health outcomes research.

History

Econometric Software, Inc. was founded in the early 1980s by William H. Greene. NLOGIT was released in 1996 with the development of the FIML nested logit estimator, originally an extension of the multinomial logit model in LIMDEP.  The program derives its name from the Nested LOGIT model.  With the additions of the multinomial probit model and the mixed logit model among several others, NLOGIT became a self standing superset of LIMDEP.

Models

NLOGIT is a full information maximum likelihood estimator for a variety of multinomial choice models. NLOGIT includes the discrete estimators in LIMDEP plus model extensions for multinomial logit (many specifications), random parameters mixed logit, random regret logit, WTP space specifications in mixed logit, scaled multinomial logit, nested logit, multinomial probit, heteroscedastic extreme value, error components, heteroscedastic logit and latent class models.

Data Analysis

NLOGIT is typically used to analyze individual, cross section data on consumer choices and decisions from multiple alternatives. Analysis may also include market shares or frequency data, data on rankings of alternatives, and panel data from repeated observation of choice situations.

The inference tools for hypothesis testing include the Wald, likelihood ratio and Lagrange multiplier tests and tools for discrete choice analysis, including built-in procedures for testing the IIA assumption of the multinomial logit model.

The models estimated by NLOGIT can be used in ‘what if’ analyses using the model simulation package. The base case model produces fitted probabilities data that aggregate to a prediction of the sample shares for the alternatives in the choice set. The simulator is then used, with the estimation data set or any other compatible data set, to recompute these shares under specified scenarios, such as a change in the price of a particular alternative or a change in household incomes.

Notes

See also

 List of statistical packages
 Comparison of statistical packages

References

 Chang, Jae Bong and Lusk, Jayson (2011). "Mixed Logit Models: Accuracy and Software Choice". Journal of Applied Econometrics 26: 167-172.
 Greene, William and Hensher, David (2010). Modeling Ordered Choices. Cambridge University Press.

External links

LIMDEP
Demonstration of NLOGIT by KV Krishna Rao

Econometrics software
Proprietary software